The white-throated rock thrush (Monticola gularis) is a species of bird in the family Muscicapidae of the order Passeriformes.

The bird's natural habitats include temperate forests.

Description, behavior, and diet
The white-throated rock thrush weighs 34 grams on average, although its weight ranges from 32 to 37 grams. Its typical generation length is 3.8 years.

Adult male white-throated rock thrushes have white patches on their chins and throats. However, the rest of their undersides are a chestnut-orange color. Adult females have brown or olive-brown upper parts and "boldly scalloped" lower parts. Young males have gray or golden-brown feathers and orange undersides. The birds are also cobalt blue and black in places.  The bird's song has been described as "melancholy, flute-like, drawn-out rising whistles".

Behavior
White-throated rock thrushes inhabit their breeding grounds between May and September. Their breeding grounds are in mixed montane forests. They breed between May and July, forming two broods. The birds' cup-shaped nests consist of tree matter, lichen, rootlets, and moss on the inside and pine needles and stems on the outside.

The diet of white-throated rock thrushes consists mainly of invertebrates. These include weevils, mole crickets, and lepidopterans.

The white-throated rock thrush is a fully migrant species.

Distribution and habitat
The white-throated rock thrush has a very sizable range, 1,710,000 square kilometers. It is native and breeds in Manchuria, the Russian Far East and neighboring areas; it winters in Indochina and southern China. The birds are occasionally seen in Japan. They have also been observed in Hong Kong and Singapore. The bird's population is unknown, but is not increasing or declining.

The white-throated rock thrush is said to be rare in North Korea. However, it is relatively common in China, except on the coast.

The bird's IUCN Red List category is "least concern".

The white-throated rock thrush inhabits forested areas, shrubland and rocky areas.

History
The white-throated rock thrush was first described by Robert Swinhoe in 1863.

Between 1988 and 2000, the bird's IUCN Red List categories have been "lower risk" and "least concern". Since 2000, its only category has been "least concern".

In modern times, white-throated rock thrushes are widely kept as pets. They are also consumed in some countries.

References

External links

 White-throated rock thrush videos and photos on the Internet Bird Collection

white-throated rock thrush
Birds of Manchuria
white-throated rock thrush
Taxonomy articles created by Polbot